Aquila (Hebrew: עֲקִילַס ʿăqīlas, fl. 130 AD) of Sinope (modern-day Sinop, Turkey) was a translator of the Hebrew Bible into Greek, a proselyte, and disciple of Rabbi Akiva.

Relationship to Onkelos
Opinions differ on whether he was the same person as Onkelos, who composed the leading Aramaic translation of the Pentateuch, known as Targum Onkelos. The names "Onkelos the proselyte" and "Aquilas the proselyte" are frequently interchanged in the Babylonian Talmud and Jerusalem Talmud.

It is not clear how much (if any) of the Aramaic translation was based on the Greek.

Greek translation 
Only fragments of this translation have survived in what remains of fragmentary documents taken from the Books of Kings and the Psalms found in the old Cairo Geniza in Fustat, Egypt, while excerpts taken from the Hexapla written in the glosses of certain manuscripts of the Septuagint were collected earlier and published by Frederick Field in his momentous work, Oxford, 1875. Epiphanius' De Ponderibus et Mensuris  preserves a tradition that he was a kinsman of the Roman emperor Hadrian, who employed him in rebuilding Jerusalem as Aelia Capitolina, and that Aquila was converted to Christianity but, on being reproved for practicing astrology, "apostatized" to Judaism. He is said also to have been a disciple of Rabbi Akiva (d. ca. 132 CE). 

In Jewish writings he is referred to as Akilas and Onkelos. Aquila's version is said to have been used in place of the Septuagint in Greek-speaking synagogues. The Christians generally disliked it, alleging that it rendered the Messianic passages incorrectly, but Jerome and Origen speak in its praise. Origen incorporated it in his Hexapla.

The Hexapla were the only known extant fragments of the work until 1897, when fragments of two codices were brought to the Cambridge University Library. These have been published: the fragments containing  1 Kings 20:7-17; 2 Kings 23:12-27 (signed as AqBurkitt) by Francis Crawford Burkitt in 1897, those containing parts of Psalms 90-103 (signed as AqTaylor) by C. Taylor in 1899. A fuller discussion appears in the Jewish Encyclopedia.

The surviving fragments of this translation, and of other Greek translations forming part of Origen's Hexapla, are now being re-published (with additional materials discovered since Field's edition) by an international group of Septuagint scholars. This work is being carried out as The Hexapla Project under the auspices of the International Organization for Septuagint and Cognate Studies, and directed by Peter J. Gentry (Southern Baptist Theological Seminary), Alison G. Salvesen (University of Oxford), and Bas ter Haar Romeny (Leiden University).

Early Rabbinic reference to Aquila's conversion 

The following story about Aquila's conversion appears in Midrash Rabbah:

See also
 Theodotion
 Onkelos
 Symmachus
 Hexapla
 Targum Onkelos

References 

Attribution:
 

People from Sinop, Turkey
Jews and Judaism in the Roman Empire
Ancient Pontic Greeks
Bible translators
Converts to Christianity from pagan religions
Converts to Judaism from Christianity
2nd-century Greek people
2nd-century Romans
2nd-century Jews
2nd-century translators
Translators of the Bible into Hellenistic Greek